Gild may refer to:
 Gilding, the application of gold leaf to other material
 Guild, an association of craftsmen